Nephrocerinae is a subfamily of big-headed flies (insects in the family Pipunculidae).

Genera
 Tribe Nephrocerini
 Genus Nephrocerus Zetterstedt, 1838
 Tribe incertae sedis
 Genus Priabona Archibald, Kehlmaier & Mathewes, 2014 Florissant Formation, Eocene (Priabonian)

References

Pipunculidae
Brachycera subfamilies